Mary Grace Canfield (September 3, 1924 – February 15, 2014) was an American theatre, film and television actress.

Early life and career
Mary Grace Canfield was born in Rochester, New York, the second child of Hildegard (née Jacobson) and Hubert Canfield. She grew up in Pittsford, New York. She had a sister, Constance, who was two years older.

Acting mostly in small theatre companies and regional theatre between 1952 and 1964, she appeared in several Broadway plays, but most ran for no more than a month. Her Broadway credits include The Waltz of the Toreadors and The Frogs of Spring.

Canfield's first credited performance on television was in March 1954 when she portrayed Frances in the episode "Native Dancer" on Goodyear Playhouse. After making additional television appearances, she played housekeeper Amanda Allison on the sitcom The Hathaways during the 1961-1962 season. As Thelma Lou's "ugly" cousin in an episode of The Andy Griffith Show, she had an arranged blind date with Gomer Pyle, played by Jim Nabors. Her name on this episode was her actual name, Mary Grace. The episode was originally scheduled to air on November 25, 1963, but it was preempted by the coverage of the assassination of President John F. Kennedy three days earlier.

Green Acres
Canfield was best known for her recurring role on the hit comedy series Green Acres as Ralph Monroe, the all-thumbs carpenter who greeted her fellow Hootervillians with her signature "Howdy Doody!" She appeared in more than 40 episodes of the show during its six-season run from 1965 to 1971. She reprised the role in the 1990 TV movie Return to Green Acres. Recalling the Ralph character in a 2006 interview, she said "To be remembered for Ralph kind of upsets me—only in the sense that it was so easy and undemanding." She added "It's being known for something easy to do instead of something you worked hard to achieve."

Other roles
She guest-starred on The Eleventh Hour. In 1966, Canfield played Abner Kravitz's sister Harriet on four episodes of Bewitched. Actress Alice Pearce, who played Abner's wife, Gladys Kravitz, had died from ovarian cancer, and her successor as Mrs. Kravitz (Sandra Gould) had yet to be hired. During the early 1970s, Canfield and actress Lucille Wall shared the role of Lucille March on General Hospital. Canfield appeared in feature films such as Pollyanna (as "Angelica"), The St. Valentine's Day Massacre and Something Wicked This Way Comes.

Later life and death
Canfield made her last public appearance in 2005 when she attended Eddie Albert's funeral with Green Acres co-stars Sid Melton and Frank Cady. Canfield died at age 89 from lung cancer on February 15, 2014, in Santa Barbara, California.

Filmography

Film

Television

References

External links
 
 

1924 births
2014 deaths
American film actresses
American television actresses
Actresses from Rochester, New York
20th-century American actresses
Deaths from lung cancer in California
People from Pittsford, New York
21st-century American women